Kanherkhed is a village in Satara district, Maharashtra, India. It was the home village of Shinde (Scindia) family that later ruled the Gwalior State.

Shinde's are Deshmukh's of Kanherkhed Village.

References 

Villages in Satara district